Gaspard Cyimana (May 30, 1930 – February 6, 1982) was a Rwandan statesman, industrialist, economist, and leader of independence who served as the 1st Minister of Finance of Rwanda. Cyimana was one of the Founding Fathers of the Republic of Rwanda, signing the original 1961 Constitution of Rwanda and the subsequent 1962 Constitution of Rwanda. He was a top leader of Rwandan independence from Belgium.  Cyimana was a leader of Hutu-Tutsi reconciliation, arguing for the necessity of a multi-ethnic society for Rwanda to be prosperous and economically feasible, and was a signer of the 1960 Entente Between the Tutsi-Hutu Youth of Rwanda.  He served as the 1st Minister of Finance, Economic Affairs and Planning of Rwanda from 1960–1968.

Cyimana was considered one of the primary leaders and most important political figures of the new nation.   Cyimana was the most outspoken critic of nepotism and the lack of qualifications among certain officials within the 1st Republic. He campaigned in parliament for civil examinations, competence tests, and public announcements of all remunerations to government officials as needed reforms. Cyimana served as a Member of Parliament representing Byumba from 1961-1969. He resigned from the cabinet in 1968 as a result of the Guta Umurongo. He was the President of the National Chamber of Commerce and became an entrepreneur for the rest of his life.

Early life and education 

Gaspard Cyimana was born in Rulindo, Ruanda-Urundi on May 30, 1930 in the province of Byumba.

Cyimana  performed well as a student, graduating first in his class at Saint Léon Minor Seminary of Kabgayi. He proceeded to study philosophy at the Grand Seminary of Nyakibanda where his continued academic excellence resulted in him being one of the first Rwandans to study abroad after he received a scholarship. He received his second university degree from the University of Lovanium in the Belgian Congo, studying Political Science and Administrative Studies. The High Council of Rwanda granted Cyimana a 2nd scholarship on behalf of King Mutara III to study finance and economics in Belgium at the University of Antwerp on account of his intellectual brilliance, becoming one of the first Rwandans to study in Europe.

Cyimana became politically active during his studies in Belgium, staying in close contact with intellectuals in Rwanda. In early 1960, he was appointed as the representative of Ruanda at the Belgo-Congolese Round Table Conference which negotiated the final terms of Congolese Independence.  He finished his studies in 1960 and was appointed Minister of Finance in the provisional government upon his return to Rwanda.

Career 

While an economics student in Belgium, Cyimana advocated for independence from Belgium and major reforms of the Rwandan political system. In his two most prominent works, he argued for a more equitable distribution of political power between the three ethnic groups, called for the end of the abuse of commoners by the aristocracy, and proposed a full set of reforms that could preserve the monarchy.  He favored democracy as a way to return power to the people and a multiparty system. In the lead up to independence, Cyimana was selected to serve as Minister of Finance in the provisional government and then as the official Minister of Finance in the 1st government. He continued to serve until his resignation in 1968.

During his tenure, Cyimana established the national financial system, the National Bank of Rwanda, the Development Bank of Rwanda, the Bank of Kigali, the Commercial Bank of Rwanda and introduced the Rwandan franc as the national currency.

He entered the private sector following his time as Minister.

Personal life 
Cyimana married Agnes Verrycken in Belgium in 1961. They had three children and one grandson.

References

Works cited 

 
 

1930 births
1982 deaths
Government ministers of Rwanda
Finance ministers of Rwanda